Louise Charbonneau is a Canadian politician, who was elected to the House of Commons of Canada in the 2019 election  from Trois-Rivières as a member of the Bloc Québécois.

In January 2021, she announced she would not run again in the federal election later that year.

Electoral record

References

Bloc Québécois MPs
Members of the House of Commons of Canada from Quebec
People from Trois-Rivières
Women members of the House of Commons of Canada
21st-century Canadian politicians
21st-century Canadian women politicians
Year of birth missing (living people)
Living people